English rapper and YouTuber KSI has released two studio albums, one collaboration album, four extended plays (EPs), 21 singles, and 32 music videos.

Albums

Studio albums

Collaborative albums

Extended plays

Singles

As lead artist

As featured artist

Charity singles

Remixes

Other charted songs

Guest appearances

Music videos

See also 

 List of songs recorded by KSI

Notes

References

Discography
Discographies of British artists
Hip hop discographies